Proclavarctus fragilis is a species of tardigrades. It is the only species in the genus Proclavarctus, part of the family Halechiniscidae. The species has been found in deep sea in the Mozambique Channel and the Bay of Biscay.

References

Further reading
Renaud-Mornant, 1983 : Tardigrades abyssaux nouveaux de la sous-famille des Euclavarctinae n. subfam. (Arthrotardigrada, Halechiniscidae). [New Deep Sea Tardigrades in the Subfamily Euclavarctinae n. subfam. (Arthrotardigrada, Halechiniscidae)] Bulletin of the Muséum National d'Histoire Naturelle Section A: Zoology, Biology and Animal Ecology, vol. 5, no. 1, p. 201-219

Halechiniscidae
Fauna of the Indian Ocean
Animals described in 1983
Taxa named by Jeanne Renaud-Mornant